Raja Ashman Shah ibni Almarhum Sultan Azlan Muhibbuddin Shah Al-Maghfur-lah (28 December 1958 – 30 March 2012) was a member of the Perak Royal Family, the second son of Sultan Azlan Shah. He was the fourth in line to the throne of the Perak Sultanate when he was the Raja Kechil Sulung of Perak from 2010 until his death in 2012.

Early life

Raja Ashman Shah was born at George Town, Penang, Malaya. 28 December 1958 as the third child of late Sultan Azlan Muhibbuddin Shah ibni Almarhum Sultan Yussuff Izzuddin Shah Ghafarullahu-lah, later Sultan Azlan Shah of Perak, and his wife Tuanku Bainun Binti Mohd Ali (herself a member of the Royal House of Perak and much third grandson of her husband's father Sultan Yussuff Izzuddin Shah of Perak)

His siblings are Raja Nazrin Shah (born 27 November 1956), Raja Azureen (born 9 December 1957), Raja Eleena (born 3 April 1960) and Raja Yong Sofia (born 24 June 1961).

Education 
Raja Ashman attended high school at St. John Institution, Kuala Lumpur. He held a bachelor's degree in economics from the University of Nottingham, a master's degree in law from Cambridge University, and a diploma in Business Law from the University of London, England. He was a barrister-at-law and a member of the English Bar.

Professional career 
Raja Ashman held a number of professional positions. He was the executive director of Dreamland Holdings from 1990, the chairman of the board of Trustees of the Haqqani Foundation Malaysia from 1994, the Chairman of Dwitasik, and the Director of KKB Engineering Bhd.

Religion 
Raja Ashman held an ijazah (permission of initiating seekers, teaching the masses and channelling divine energy) from Shaykh Nazim 'Adil al-Haqqani in the Naqshbandi Haqqani Sufi Order. Known as Sheikh Raja in the Sufi order, he was the representative of Shaykh Nazim in Malaysia and Singapore. He established the Naqshbandi zawiya in Kuala Lumpur. He was also revered by some members of the Order as one of Shaykh Nazim's worldwide successors.

Personal life 
He married Noraini Jane binti Kamarul Ariffin (born 1960) on 26 September 1991 in Kuala Kangsar. She is the daughter of Kamarul Ariffin bin Muhammad Yassin, former Senator and chair of the Board of Trustees of the National Art Gallery.

They had one son and two daughters: 
 Raja Emina Aliyyah binti Almarhum Raja Ashman Shah (born 17 September 1992)
 Raja Ahmad Nazim Azlan Shah bin Raja Ashman Shah, Raja Kechil Sulong (born 10 March 1994) 
 Raja Bainunisa Safia binti Raja Ashman Shah (born 3 April 1997)

Death 
Raja Ashman died on 30 March 2012, due to an asthma attack. He was survived by his wife, parents, siblings, and children. He was buried at the Al-Ghufran Royal Mausoleum near Ubudiah Mosque, Kuala Kangsar.

Honours 
He was awarded:

Honours of Perak 
  Member Second Class of the Azlanii Royal Family Order (DKA II)
  Grand Knight of the Order of Cura Si Manja Kini (the Perak Sword of State, SPCM, 19 April 1988) with title Dato' Seri—current ribbon :

Ancestry

References

1960 births
People from Penang
Royal House of Perak
2012 deaths
Respiratory disease deaths in Malaysia
Deaths from asthma
Alumni of the University of Cambridge
Alumni of the University of Nottingham
Malaysian businesspeople
Malaysian people of Malay descent
Malaysian Muslims
Sons of monarchs